Eti is a 2008 Bengali film directed  by Sambit Nag.

Cast
 Gourab Chattopadhyay – Sanjay
 Roopali Ganguly – Shreya
 Bhaswar Chattopadhyay – Dipu
 Sudip Mukhopadhyay – Shreya's Elder Brother
 Papiya Sen
 Manajit Boral
 Sweta Tewari – Paramita
 Swaralipi Chatterjee – Ananya
 Dhruv Mukherjee
 Faiz Khan – Artist
 Pradip Mukhopadhyay – Shreya's Father

References

2008 films
2000s Bengali-language films
Bengali-language Indian films